The Citroën Zabrus was a concept car of a 2+2 shooting brake design with three doors which was designed by the car manufacturer Bertone. It was based on the mechanics of the Citroën BX 4TC. It was first presented in May 1986 at the Turin Motor Show. The hatchback of the Citroën BX itself was based on a design by Bertone.

Some unique features, of the car were the all LCD monitor display, for odometer, gauges etc. The car also included a “belt type” steering wheel that used to rotate in either direction while mounted on the main display. The Citroën Zabrus is a shooting brake with a design of 2+2 seating configuration, with two scissor doors upfront for easy access to the rear seats.

Like the 4TC, the Zabrus is all wheel drive and power is sent to the wheels through the five speed manual transmission.

References

Zabrus
Cars introduced in 1986
Executive cars
Coupés

All-wheel-drive vehicles